China Railway Lanzhou Group, officially abbreviated as CR Lanzhou or CR-Lanzhou, formerly, Lanzhou Railway Administration is a subsidiaries company under the jurisdiction of the China Railway (formerly the Ministry of Railway). It supervises the railway network within eastern Gansu, Ningxia, and western Inner Mongolia. The railway administration was reorganized as a company in November 2017.

Hub stations
 Lanzhou
 , 
 Yinchuan
 
 Tianshui
 ,

Regional services

C-train services

References

Rail transport in Gansu
Rail transport in Ningxia
China Railway Corporation